The curse of 39, also referred to as triakontenneaphobia, is the fear of the number 39. In some parts of Afghanistan, the number is considered to be cursed or a badge of shame as it is purportedly linked with curse, shame, and prostitution.

Origin 

The origin of the superstition is unclear, but it has widely been claimed to have been associated with a pimp, allegedly living in the western city of Herat, who was nicknamed "39" after the registration plate of his expensive car and the number of his apartment. The number is said to translate into morda-gow (literally meaning "dead cow") which is a well-known slang term for a pimp. Others have blamed corrupt police officials for spreading the rumour in order to charge between $200–500 to change a "39" plate.

Officials have, in turn, blamed car dealers and "those who work for the mafia [who] started the rumours about 39 so they could buy cars with 39 plates cheaper and sell them back for higher prices after changing the plates", according to Abdul Qader Samoonwal of Kabul's Traffic and License Registration department.

Perception 
Vehicle registration plates incorporating the number 39 are seen as so undesirable that vehicles bearing the numerals are said to be virtually unsellable in the capital, Kabul. The drivers of such vehicles have reported receiving abuse, derision, and other unwanted attention from pedestrians and other drivers, and some have had their registration plates altered to disguise the numbers. The issue caused particular problems in Kabul after the Persian New Year of March 2011, when the government started to issue registration plates beginning with 39. Despite the threat of penalties, many drivers refused to register their cars while the number 39 still appeared on them. Drivers with license plates containing the digits 39 have reported receiving nicknames such as "Colonel 39". Cellphone owners have encountered similar problems, forcing them to hide their caller ID or switch their numbers altogether. Some 39-year-old Afghans refer to themselves as being "one less than 40" or "one year to 40".

During the 2010 Afghan parliamentary election; two people were killed when the guards of the candidate Mullah Tarakhil opened fire on civilians after a traffic accident, said to have been in reaction to people taunting the Tarakhil because he was listed 39th on the ballot.

Reactions 
Afghan government officials and numerologists have tried to scotch the claims about 39, though with little success. General Assadullah, the head of the traffic department in Kabul, described the problem as "nonsense" as 39 is "just a number". He noted that there is no religious prohibition against the number and his department has sought to reassure the public by noting where Muslims can find the number 39 in the Quran and even publishing a formula by which the number can be derived from the name "Allah".

Sediq Afghan, a famous numerologist, has likewise complained that people "only see the negative side" of the number and has called it "a sickness for Afghans". He told television viewers that associating the number with pimps "is a sin because 57 Suras from our Quran contain the number 39." The popular television satire show Danger Bell highlighted the issue but only succeeded in publicising it even further.

Some car dealers have been able to profit from it, as the problem exists mainly in Kabul; one dealer told The Wall Street Journal that he "could knock several thousand dollars off the purchase price of a car in Kabul with 39 on its plate and then turn around to sell it for a profit in the surrounding provinces."

Owners of vehicles with "39" in their registration plates have sought to fix the problem themselves. Many have "edited" their own plates by painting or taping over the offending digits or altering them to make the number 3 look like an 8, or even covering over the entire plate. One driver told NPR: "I have no choice but to drive this car since I earn my living working here. But I have to cover the 39 plates with a blue sheet. I do this to protect the dignity of this organization and also of myself."

See also

Triskaidekaphobia
Tetraphobia

References

External links
"Loya jirga: Afghan elders reject 'pimp's number 39'", BBC News, 17 November 2011

Curses
Numerology
Prostitution in Afghanistan
Urban legends
Superstitions about numbers
Superstitions of Asia
Afghan culture